Ariadaeus is a small, bowl-shaped lunar impact crater on the western shores of Mare Tranquillitatis. It lies to the north of the crater Dionysius, and to the west-southwest of Arago. The crater is joined along the northeast rim by the slightly smaller Ariadaeus A, and the two form a double-crater. Its diameter is 10.4 km.

This crater marks the eastern extent of the rille designated Rima Ariadaeus. This wide rille extends in a nearly straight line to the west-northwest, passing just to the north of the crater Silberschlag. Other rille systems lie in the vicinity, including the Rimae Ritter to the southeast and Rimae Sosigenes to the northeast.

The crater was named after Philip III of Macedon (Arrhidaeus).

Satellite craters
By convention these features are identified on lunar maps by placing the letter on the side of the crater midpoint that is closest to Ariadaeus.

Notes

References

External links

Lunar Orbiter 2 frame 59, showing Ariadaeus B in high resolution

Impact craters on the Moon